In signal processing, the fast folding algorithm (Staelin, 1969) is an efficient algorithm for the detection of approximately-periodic events within time series data. It computes superpositions of the signal modulo various window sizes simultaneously.

The FFA is best known for its use in the detection of pulsars, as popularised by SETI@home and Astropulse.

See also

 Pulsar

References

External links
 The search for unknown pulsars

Signal processing